I See You is the third studio album by English indie pop band the xx. It was released on 13 January 2017 by the Young Turks record label. It was the band's first album in more than four years, following 2012's Coexist.

The xx began recording I See You in 2014 at Marfa Recording Co. in Marfa, Texas, and were assisted by producer Rodaidh McDonald. According to the band, they had a more progressive, wide-ranging musical concept in mind, compared to their previous two albums. Jamie xx, the band's multi-instrumentalist and producer, said the album's sound and aesthetic were influenced by his 2015 club-influenced solo recording, In Colour.

I See You was released to widespread critical acclaim, with many reviewers finding its music less insular than the xx's previous recordings. It became the band's second number-one album in the United Kingdom and an international top-ten chart success. Four singles were released to promote the album, beginning with "On Hold", while the xx embarked on the European I See You Tour and subsequent concerts in the Americas.

Recording and production 
The xx announced in May 2014 that they were working on their third studio album with producer Rodaidh McDonald at Marfa Recording Co., a recording studio in Marfa, Texas. According to Mixmag journalist Stephen Worthy, a "watershed" moment had occurred immediately before recording commenced when during a series of New York concerts, the trio—Romy Madley Croft, Oliver Sim, and Jamie Smith—"barely made eye contact with their audience. It was their way of saying goodbye to the old xx". While working on I See You, Croft enrolled in a songwriting course in California, Sim modelled for Christian Dior SE, and Smith released a solo album, 2015's In Colour.

Smith, the xx's producer and multi-instrumentalist, stated that In Colour "definitely informed what we're doing" for I See You, while the band said the record would have a "completely different concept" from their first two albums. They also said the album would sound "more outward-looking, open and expansive". I See You was described by AnyDecentMusic? as an album of indie rock and dream pop music, while Matt Hobbs from God is in the TV said the xx expanded on the dance portion of their usual fusion of indie and alternative dance sounds. According to Pitchforks November 2016 update on the album, I See You was ultimately recorded between March 2014 and August 2016 at studios in Marfa, New York City, Los Angeles, London, and Reykjavík.

Marketing and sales 
The album's lead single, "On Hold", was released on 10 November 2016, premiering on the xx's YouTube account ahead of the album's release date being announced. On 19 November, the band performed as the musical guest on the American sketch comedy show Saturday Night Live. "Say Something Loving" was released as the second single on 1 January 2017.

I See You was released on 13 January 2017 by Young Turks. In its first week, it sold 26,513 copies in the United Kingdom and debuted at number one on the British albums chart, becoming the xx's second album to top the chart, after Coexist did in 2012. In the United States, I See You debuted at number two on the Billboard 200 and recorded 46,000 album-equivalent units; 36,000 of these were traditional album sales. In Japan, it entered the Oricon Albums Chart at number 34 and sold 2,073 copies in its first week there.

The xx supported the album with the I See You Tour, performing concerts throughout Europe in February and March 2017. This was followed by a series of music festival appearances in South America, including the Estéreo Picnic Festival in Bogotá and Lollapalooza dates in São Paulo, San Isidro, and Santiago. A North American tour began on 14 April at the Coachella Music Festival in Indio, California and concluded on 26 May in Portland, Maine.

Critical reception 

I See You was met with widespread critical acclaim. At Metacritic, which assigns a normalised rating out of 100 to reviews from mainstream publications, the album received an average score of 85, based on 35 reviews. According to Kitty Empire, it was hailed by critics as the xx's "least insular album thus far".

Writing for The Guardian, Alexis Petridis said the record "pulls off the feat of managing to sound both exactly like the xx and unlike anything they have done before". He believed the band's willingness to explore musical influences from Smith's In Colour album gave the tracks a "richer and fuller" quality than on their previous records. I See You was called "the most eclectic, multidimensional, and ambitious album of The xx’s young career" by Philip Cosores from The A.V. Club, while Entertainment Weeklys Nolan Feeney deemed it "the boldest work yet from a band famous for subtlety". In the opinion of Uncut reviewer Sam Richards, the band "expanded their horizons without sacrificing any of the emotional intimacy that makes them one of the most compelling acts around". Q critic Victoria Segal noted its shared lyrical themes with Coexist and echoes of the "club culture" from In Colour, while concluding that musically, the band were "extending past glories rather than copying them". "Sim's and Madley Croft's vocal melodies are sturdier and more shapely than in the past", Mikael Wood wrote in the Los Angeles Times, surmising it to be "a product perhaps of the time Madley Croft spent in L.A. between xx albums working on potential songs for pop stars."

Some critics were less enthusiastic. In Vice, Robert Christgau observed artistic growth and accessibility in songs such as "On Hold", "Say Something Loving", and "Brave for You"; but said, "however impressive their originality and skill, the details always end up getting away" throughout the album's "indistinct murmurs ... because in the end the band's shared aesthetic is so contained." Will Hodgkinson was more critical in The Times, writing that the album failed to "hit the highs of their previous work" while accusing the group of posturing, making note of Croft's "breathy emoting" on "Brave for You".

Accolades
According to Acclaimed Music, I See You was the 16th most prominently ranked record on critics' year-end lists of 2017's best albums. It was also nominated for IMPALA's European Album of the Year Award.

Track listing 
All lyrics written by Oliver Sim and Romy Madley Croft; all music composed by Jamie Smith, Sim, and Croft; all tracks produced by Smith and Rodaidh McDonald; unless otherwise noted.

Sample credits
 "Say Something Loving" contains a sample of "Do You Feel It", performed by Alessi, and written by Bobby and Billy Alessi, and homage to "The Sweetest Taboo", performed by Sade, and written by Sade Adu and Martin Ditcham
 "Lips" contains a sample of "Just (After Song of Songs)", performed by Trio Mediæval, Garth Knox, Agnès Vesterman and Sylvain Lemêtre, and written by David Lang
 "On Hold" contains a sample of "I Can't Go for That (No Can Do)", performed by Daryl Hall & John Oates and written by Sara Allen, Daryl Hall and John Oates
 "Naive" contains a sample of "Doing It Wrong", performed by Drake, and written by Aubrey Graham, Adrian Eccleston, Don McLean and Noah Shebib

Personnel 
Credits adapted from the album's liner notes.

The xx 
 Romy Madley Croft – guitar, vocals; keyboards ; additional production ; art direction, design
 Oliver Sim – bass, vocals; photography
 Jamie Smith – synths, drums, keys; violin ; piano ; vocals ; guitar ; production, engineering; programming; mixing; string arrangements

Additional personnel 

 Rodaidh McDonald – production, engineering
 David Wrench – additional programming; mixing
 Marta Salogni – engineering
 John Davis – mastering
 Stella Mozgawa – drums 
 Hal Ritson – brass recording and engineering ; additional programming, bass guitar 
 Neil Waters – trumpet 
 Ben Somers – saxophone 
 Iskra Strings – strings 
 John Smart – violin 
 Oli Langford – violin 
 James Underwood – violin 
 Eos Counsell – violin 
 Emma Owens – viola 
 Laurie Anderson – viola 
 Peter Gregson – cello 
 Charlotte Eksteen – cello 
 Paul Frith – orchestration 
 Sam Thompson – orchestration 
 Phil Lee – art direction, design

Charts

Weekly charts

Year-end charts

Certifications

References

External links 
 
 

2017 albums
Albums produced by Jamie xx
The xx albums
Young Turks (record label) albums
Albums produced by Rodaidh McDonald
Albums recorded at The Church Studios